The 2017–18 season was the 108th season of competitive football in Germany.

Promotion and relegation

Pre-season

Post-season

National teams

Germany national football team

2018 FIFA World Cup qualifying

2018 FIFA World Cup qualifying UEFA Group C

2018 FIFA World Cup

2018 FIFA World Cup Group F

2018 FIFA World Cup fixtures and results

Friendly matches

Germany women's national football team

2019 FIFA Women's World Cup qualification

2018 SheBelieves Cup

Friendly matches

League season

Men

Bundesliga

Bundesliga standings

2. Bundesliga

2. Bundesliga standings

3. Liga

3. Liga standings

DFB-Pokal

2017–18 DFB-Pokal

Final

DFL-Supercup

2017 DFL-Supercup

Women

Frauen-Bundesliga

2. Frauen-Bundesliga

Nord

Süd

2017–18 DFB-Pokal (women)

German clubs in Europe

UEFA Champions League

Play-off round

|}

Group stage

Group B

Group G

Group H

Knockout phase

Round of 16

|}

Quarter-finals

|}

Semi-finals

|}

UEFA Europa League

Third qualifying round

|}

Group stage

Group C

Group H

Group J

Knockout phase

Round of 32

|}

Round of 16

|}

Quarter-finals

|}

UEFA Women's Champions League

Knockout phase

Round of 32

|}

Round of 16

|}

Quarter-finals

|}

Semi-finals

Final

Sources

 
Seasons in German football